Vulsella is a genus of bivalves belonging to the family Vulsellidae.

The genus has almost cosmopolitan distribution.

Species:

Vulsella angusta 
Vulsella clarki 
Vulsella deperdita 
Vulsella fornicata 
Vulsella grandicubitus 
Vulsella laevigata 
Vulsella legumen 
Vulsella margaritacea 
Vulsella minor 
Vulsella ovata 
Vulsella pakistanica 
Vulsella rugosa 
Vulsella vulsella

References

Ostreida
Bivalve genera